Brezje is a village in the municipality of Čelić, Bosnia and Herzegovina.

Demographics 
According to the 2013 census, its population was 20, all Serbs.

References

Populated places in Čelić